Stora Dyrön is an island and a locality situated in Tjörn Municipality, Västra Götaland County, Sweden with 250 inhabitants in 2010.

References 

Populated places in Västra Götaland County
Populated places in Tjörn Municipality